Would You Stay For Tea? (Hangul: 차 마실래?; RR: cha masillae?), also known as Walk Me Home, is the third extended play by South Korean girl group Hello Venus. It was released on May 2, 2013, by Tricell Media and distributed by NHN Entertainment. This was the last release with members Yoo Ara and Yoonjo, after their departure on mid-2014.

The EP was a commercial success peaking at number 6 on the Gaon Album Chart. It has sold over 8,400 physical copies as of May 2013.

Release 
The EP was digitally released on May 2, 2013, through several music portals, including MelOn in South Korea, and iTunes for the global market.

Promotion

Live performances 
The group held their first comeback stage on Mnet's M Countdown on May 2, 2013, performing the title track. They continued on MBC's Show! Music Core on May 4, SBS's Inkigayo on May 5 and MBC Music's Show Champion on May 8.

Singles 
"Would You Stay For Tea?" was released as the title track in conjunction with the EP on May 2, 2013. A music video teaser for the song was released on April 25. The official music video was released on May 2, through the group's official Youtube channel. The video follows each member in a date with a guy. The song debuted at number 37 on the Gaon Digital Chart, on the chart issue dated April 28 - May 4, 2013, with 75,881 downloads sold. A week later, the song peaked at number 33, with 63,128 downloads sold. The song also entered at number 42 on the chart for the month of May 2013, with 222,689 downloads sold. It also charted at number 97 for the month of June.

Commercial performance 
Would You Stay For Tea? debuted and peaked at number 6 on the Gaon Album Chart, on the chart issue dated April 28 - May 4, 2013. In its second week, the EP fell to number 43 and to number 83 in its third week. In its fifth week, the EP saw a rise to number 18. The EP placed at number 56 before dropping the chart after eight consecutive weeks.

The EP entered at number 11 on the chart for the month of May 2013, with 8,447 physical copies sold.

Track listing

Charts

Release history

References 

2013 EPs
K-pop EPs
Hello Venus albums